Year 142 (CXLII) was a common year starting on Sunday (link will display the full calendar) of the Julian calendar. At the time, it was known in the Roman Empire as the Year of the Consulship of Pactumeius and Quadratus (or, less frequently, year 895 Ab urbe condita). The denomination 142 for this year has been used since the early medieval period, when the Anno Domini calendar era became the prevalent method in Europe for naming years.

Events 
 By place 
 Roman Empire 
 Emperor Antoninus Pius  orders the construction of the Antonine Wall. The wall stretches 39 miles (63 km), from Old Kilpatrick in West Dunbartonshire on the Firth of Clyde, to Carriden near Bo'ness on the Firth of Forth (Scotland). The Romans build 19 forts and smaller fortlets (milecastles), to protect the border against the Caledonians. 
 Municipal doctors are named throughout the Roman Empire.

 Asia 
 First year of the Hanan era of the Chinese Han Dynasty.
 The Chinese Taoist alchemist Wei Boyang, author of the Kinship of the Three, is the first to describe an early form of gunpowder solution.

 By topic 
 Religion 
 Marcion proclaims that the Old Testament is incompatible with Christianity.

Births 
 Papinian, Roman jurist and praetorian prefect (d. 212) 
 Elpinice, Roman noblewoman (d. 165)
 Liu Biao, Chinese governor (d. 208)

Deaths 
 Hyginus, bishop of Rome (approximate date)

References